Pseudagrion arabicum is a species of damselfly in the family Coenagrionidae. It is found in Saudi Arabia and Yemen. Its natural habitat is rivers. It is threatened by habitat loss.

References

Coenagrionidae
Insects described in 1980
Taxonomy articles created by Polbot